Pinoy Explorer is a Philippine infotainment show hosted by Aga Muhlach and aired on TV5. It airs every Saturdays at 6:45-7:45 pm after Magic Gimik: Revealed. It debuted on September 18, 2011, and features clips from the “Clash of the Titans” series and BBC's “Walking with Dinosaurs.”

It is an edutainment program wherein Aga Muhlach, the host travels to many different places around the globe with an aim to educate the Filipino viewers in discovering the wonders of the world: places, people, artifacts, and history.  The program not only showcases trips to other places but it also educates viewers and takes them on journeys of discovery using cutting-edge technology. The show ended on May 4, 2013 as Aga runs for congressman for the 4th district of Camarines Sur.

Pinoy Explorer returned on-air on TV5 by September 15, 2013 and aired its last episode on March 15, 2014, with its last destination is in Russia, coinciding the 2014 Sochi Olympics.

Host
 Aga Muhlach
 Klariz Magboo (trivia voice-over)

Trivia
According to reports, Pinoy Explorer got the highest pilot rating when it was aired last Sunday at 6:30 pm compared to other TV shows in other networks based on the Neilsen Media Research. It posted an impressive 8.3% AMR or a total of 1,975,813 absolute viewers – 84,295 more than ABS-CBN’s TV Patrol Weekend’s 1,891,518 (7.9% AMR); and 465,543 viewers more than GMA’s 24 Oras Weekend’s 1,510,270 (6.3% AMR).

Destinations
 Episode 1: Thermopolis, Wyoming, USA
 Episodes 2–3: Cody, Wyoming, USA
 Episodes 4–5: Arcata, Humboldt County, California, USA
 Episodes 6–7: Alaska, USA
 Episodes 9–10: Dubai, United Arab Emirates
 Episodes 11–12: Nepal
 Episode 13: Abu Dhabi, United Arab Emirates
 Episode 14: Dubai, United Arab Emirates
 Episodes 15–16: Hong Kong SAR, China
 Episode 17: Shenzhen, China
 Episodes 22–23: Ho Chi Minh, Vietnam
 Episode 23: Hanoi, Vietnam
 Halong Bay, Vietnam
 Episode 24: Kuala Lumpur, Malaysia
 Albay, Philippines
 Episode 26: Camarines Sur
 Episode 27: Donsol, Sorsogon, Philippines
 Episode 28: Rome, Italy
 Venice, Italy
 Milan, Italy
 Batanes, Philippines
 Los Baños, Laguna, Philippines
 Anilao, Batangas, Philippines
 Cavite, Philippines
 Korea
 Sydney, Australia
 Russia

Awards and nominations

See also
 List of programs broadcast by TV5
 List of programs aired by TV5

References

External links
 

2011 Philippine television series debuts
2014 Philippine television series endings
TV5 (Philippine TV network) original programming
Filipino-language television shows